Casper's Haunted Christmas is a 2000 computer-animated Christmas supernatural dark comedy film produced by Harvey Comics and Mainframe Entertainment, based on the character Casper the Friendly Ghost, and was released by Universal Studios Home Video on October 31, 2000 (Halloween). Unlike either its theatrical or two direct-to-video predecessors, which combined live action and computer animation, the film was fully computer animated. It stars Brendon Ryan Barrett (who previously starred in Casper: A Spirited Beginning as a different character) as the voice of the title character. Randy Travis provided original music.

Plot
After a scaring spree at a Drive-in theater, the Ghostly Trio's are confronted by Casper who is then confronted by Officer Snivel who informs him that his scare quota is down. The Trio take Snivel's whistle and blow it which summons Kibosh, the perfidious King of Ghosts, who decrees that Casper must scare someone before Christmas Day, according to ghost law which requires him to purposely scare at least one person a year, or he will be banished to the Dark, together with his uncles, for their failed responsibility for him, for all eternity. To make sure Casper scares someone, he confiscates the Trio's haunting licenses and flings them to the Christmas-influenced town Kriss, Massachusetts, on account of the Trio's hatred of the holiday, where they meet the Jollimore Family. When Casper's good behavior starts to act up, which includes befriending the daughter of the family, Holly, the Ghostly Trio call in Casper's lookalike cousin Spooky, who brings along his girlfriend Poil, to do the job disguised as Casper in the hope of fooling Kibosh.

With Casper and Spooky unlikely to scare someone after a series of failed attempts the Trio decide to plot a scaring spree stealing every Christmas present in Kriss, in a reference to How the Grinch Stole Christmas, and taking them to the Jollimores' house where they plan to lure the townspeople then set off scary booby traps to go out with a bang before being banished to the Dark. Casper along with Spooky and Poil scare the Trio using a fake Kibosh made from the Jollimores' giant Santa. Casper then summons the real Kibosh using Snivel's whistle to inform him he scared the Trio, fulfilling his ghostly obligation, however, Snivel informs Kibosh of the booby traps, violating the no scaring order on the Trio. To prevent Kibosh from banishing them to the Dark, the Trio claim they intend to spring the traps on themselves to entertain Kibosh. After the act, Kibosh accepts the Trio's claim and returns their haunting licenses before leaving with Snivel. The film ends with the remaining ghosts celebrating Christmas with the Jollimore family.

Cast

Crew
 Ian Boothby - Co-writer
 Roger Fredericks - Co-writer
 Kris Zimmerman - Voice Director
 Byron Vaughns - Producer
 Owen Hurley - Director

Marketing
In the United States Baskin Robbins, whose logo is featured on an ice cream store in the film, made a tie-in promotion with the VHS release of Casper's Haunted Christmas, by inventing a Casper-themed ice cream flavor that was available throughout December. The chain also inserted a coupon good for free ice cream sundaes inside every video.

See also
List of ghost films
 List of Christmas films

References

External links
 

2000 computer-animated films
2000 direct-to-video films
2000s ghost films
Canadian direct-to-video films
American direct-to-video films
2000s English-language films
Universal Pictures direct-to-video animated films
Canadian animated feature films
2000s children's animated films
Direct-to-video fantasy films
Casper the Friendly Ghost films
Casper the Friendly Ghost
2000s American animated films
Rainmaker Studios films
Films set in Wales
Universal Pictures direct-to-video films
American Christmas films
American children's animated fantasy films
American comedy horror films
Canadian Christmas films
American ghost films
Canadian ghost films
Films based on American comics
Films based on Harvey Comics
Canadian children's fantasy films
2000s children's fantasy films
Canadian comedy horror films
Animated Christmas films
English-language Canadian films
Films directed by Owen Hurley
2000s Canadian films